Newbridge College, the Dominican College Newbridge, is a co-educational private fee-paying voluntary secondary school in Newbridge, County Kildare, Ireland, run by the Roman Catholic Dominican Order. The Dominican Friars founded Newbridge College in 1852 as a boarding school for boys. Today, still run by the Dominican Fathers, Newbridge College is a mixed day school with a student population of almost 1,000 pupils.

History

Foundation

The Dominican College in Newbridge was founded in 1852 by Fr Dominic Walker and Fr Nicholas Freyne, who established the College as a result of the high and increasing demand for secondary Catholic education owing to Catholic emancipation in Ireland at the time. In its first year of establishment, Newbridge College had an enrolment of 50 students. A cap was placed on the number of pupils enrolled. In 1870 the second church on the grounds was built. The restriction was lifted in 1894 and the roll grew to 100 students.

In 1924, Junior House and the Clock Tower were constructed. 1941 saw the Senior Cup Team (SCT) win the Colleges' first Leinster Schools Rugby Senior Cup, trained by Fr Leahy, OP. In 1950, the Junior Cup Team (JCT) won the schools first Leinster Schools Junior Cup Final. Building began for Senior House in 1951. In 1952 the College marked its centenary, events to celebrate the milestone were attended by the President of Ireland Seán T. O'Kelly, Taoiseach Éamon de Valera, the Papal Nuncio, the Master of the Dominican Order and the Bishop of Kildare and Leighlin.

The Newbridge College Past Pupils Union, which still exists today, was established by Dr JJ Cosgrove in 1937.

In 1956, with completion of Senior House and the refectory, there were almost 300 boys enrolled, 250 of whom were boarders. The third and current church was built in 1966, consecrated by Cardinal Michael Browne, OP. 1970 saw Newbridge win another Senior Cup, against Blackrock College, with a team trained by Fr John Heffernan, OP and captained by future Irish international Mick Quinn. In 1980 the bridge over the River Liffey was constructed, and the sports fields were moved from the quadrangle to the land across the Liffey.

Later developments
In 1984, one of the most significant changes in the schools' history took place – the admission of girls to the school for the first time. Today, approximately 50% of the school's pupils are female.

April 1994 saw the opening of the new gym block, science, art and technology suites behind Junior House by the Minister for Education. An all-weather pitch used for girls hockey was also built.

The practice of boarding came to an end in 1998, and the College became a fully coeducational day school. The option for day students to get evening tea and take part in supervised study until 9.30pm started, a practice which still takes places today. 1998 was also the year in which the first female School Captain, Tara Flanagan, was elected, and the first day student.

The College celebrated its 170th anniversary in 2022.

In April 2008, a new €6 million euro extension to Junior House was completed, with new science laboratories, technical and computer rooms, a new staff room and a new social area.

In 2013, an all-weather floodlit AstroTurf sports facility was commissioned at the cost of €1 million. It is used for rugby, hockey, running and other sports.

Motto

The College coat of arms bears two mottos. Veritas (Latin for 'Truth') is the motto of the Dominican Order. Cur me persequeris ('Why do you persecute me?') is the motto of the Eustace family, who donated the land upon which the school is built. The reference is to Saint Eustace, who, while out hunting, encountered a stag with a cross between his antlers (visible in the College's arms); the stag addressed the saint in the terms of the motto.

St Thomas Aquinas is the patron saint of Newbridge College.

Location
Newbridge College is located north of Newbridge, Co. Kildare, a large urban town with a population of 22,000 people. The school is situated on either side of the banks of the River Liffey, which passes through the school grounds, with a bridge connecting the college to its sports fields. Students come from the surrounding counties, including Wicklow, Dublin, Laois and Offaly.

Academic

Catering for both boys and girls, the school provides the Junior Certificate, Transition Year, Leaving Certificate, Leaving Certificate Applied and Leaving Certificate Vocational Programmes as prescribed by the Department of Education. The College follows the curricular programmes as set out by the DES in accordance with Sections 9 and 30 of the Education Act 1998.

Newbridge College performs very strongly year-on-year when it comes to academic results, consistently topping the Kildare schools league tables (often sending 100% of sixth year pupils to third level education) and was recently ranked as the second best academic performer in the Leinster province.

Dr John Monahan, PhD, was the inaugural winner of the BT Young Scientist & Technology Exhibition, then a student of Newbridge College in 1965, he went on to establish a NASDAQ-listed biotech company in California.

Admissions
There are a limited number of places available for first years. The 2015/2016 intake was 144. First year is generally three times oversubscribed, and it is not uncommon for there to be 500 or 600 applications. Prospective first years must sit an entrance exam and interview with the principal before acceptance, and preference is given to those with relatives who have or are currently attending the school. The school awards two academic scholarships annually, on the basis of the results obtained in a scholarship examination. Music and sports scholarships have also been awarded.

Fees
The fee per student for the 2017/2018 academic year was €4,225.

Sports
Newbridge College twice won the Leinster Schools Rugby Senior Cup, in 1941 and 1970. In 2012, the school were victorious in the Leinster Schools Vinnie Murray Cup. They won the Leinster Schools Junior Cup final in 1950 and again in 2020, where they shared the Junior Cup with Blackrock College. The school has also made it to several finals, including both the Senior and Junior Cup finals in 1939.

Other sports are played at the school, including hockey (for girls), equestrian sport, athletics, canoeing, soccer, GAA, basketball and golf.

In Gaelic games, Newbridge won the Leinster Colleges Senior Football Championship in 1923 and were finalists in 1922 Leinster Colleges Senior Football Championship. In 1926, the school were finalists in the Leinster Colleges Senior Hurling Championship.

Since April 1944, the 'Triangular Sword Competition' – a format between Newbridge College, Clongowes Wood College and the Cadet School of the Defence Forces Military College – has taken place. It involves six sports: golf, Gaelic football, football, swimming, athletics and basketball.

Sports facilities at the school include an indoor gymnasium (indoor running track, basketball court, soccer), a gym equipped with weights, an outdoor running track, tennis courts, playing fields, an all-weather hockey pitch, and two floodlight artificial playing surfaces for all-weather rugby, hockey and athletics.

Rugby honours

 Leinster Schools Rugby Senior Cup – 1941, 1970, 2020,2023 (joint winners both SCT and JCT), (runners-up 1932, 1939, 1945, 1959, 1966, 1996)
 Leinster Schools Junior Cup – 1950, 2020, 2021,2023 (runners-up 1929, 1938, 1939, 1941, 1947, 1956, 1998, 2012)

Notable alumni

Government, military, legal and education
David Byrne – former Attorney General of Ireland, European Commissioner, Chancellor of Dublin City University (DCU)
Noel Lemass – former Fianna Fáil TD and Minister of State at the Department of Finance
Michael Lynch – Irish Army officer and recipient of the Military Medal for Gallantry

Business
Myles Lee – former chief executive of CRH plc
Feargal Quinn – founder of Superquinn and member of Seanad Éireann
William Doyle – CEO of Newbridge Silverware
John Monahan – Biochemist and founder of Avigen Inc

Clerics
 Bishop Derek Byrne, SPS – Bishop of Primavera do Leste–Paranatinga, Brazil (2014–present), Bishop of Guiratinga, Brazil (2008-2014)
 Fr. Wilfrid Harrington OP, Dominican theologian

Arts and entertainment
Henry Flanagan –  Dominican priest, teacher, musician and artist
John Skehan – broadcaster
Cyril Cusack – actor
Christy Moore – folk singer, songwriter, and guitarist
Dónal Lunny – folk musician and producer 
Luka Bloom – folk-rock singer-songwriter
Barry Murphy – comedian
Dave Allen – comedian 
Fintan Cullen – art historian
Holt McCallany – actor
Brendan Graham – songwriter and novelist

Rugby union
Mick Quinn – former Irish rugby union player and coach
Mick Doyle – former Irish rugby international and coach
Robbie McGrath – former Irish rugby international and member of the 1982 Triple Crown winning team
Freddie McLennan – former Irish rugby international
Fionn Carr – Connacht Rugby player
Geordan Murphy – former Leicester Tigers and Irish rugby player
Tony Buckley – Munster Rugby and Irish rugby player
Johne Murphy – Munster rugby player
John O'Sullivan – former Connacht, Munster and current SU Agen rugby player
Bernard Jackman – former Leinster and Ireland rugby player and coach 
Tom Grace – Honorary Treasurer for the Irish Rugby Football Union (IRFU)
James Connolly – professional rugby union player for Connacht Rugby
James Tracy – UCD and Leinster Rugby front-row
Sam Coghlan Murray – UCD and Nottingham RFC rugby player
 Jimmy O'Brien – Ireland national rugby sevens team player
Jamie Heaslip – former Leinster Rugby and Ireland rugby player
Cian Prendergast -  Connacht Rugby player

Other sport
Dermot Weld – racehorse trainer
Aubrey Brabazon – horse racing jockey and Cheltenham winner 
Louise Quinn – Irish women's senior international soccer player
Helen Kearney - Paralympic dressage rider with 3 medals from the 2012 London Paralympics and 2016 Rio Paralympics

References

External links
Newbridge College website

Newbridge, County Kildare
Catholic secondary schools in the Republic of Ireland
Secondary schools in County Kildare
Dominican schools in the Republic of Ireland
Boarding schools in Ireland
Private schools in the Republic of Ireland
Educational institutions established in 1852
1852 establishments in Ireland